SriLankan Airlines (formerly known as Air Lanka) is the flag carrier of Sri Lanka and a member airline of the Oneworld airline alliance. It is currently the largest airline in Sri Lanka by number of aircraft and destinations and was launched in 1979 as Air Lanka following the termination of operations of the original Sri Lankan flag carrier Air Ceylon. Following its partial acquisition in 1998 by Emirates, it was re-branded and the current livery was introduced. In 2008, the government of Sri Lanka acquired all the shares of the airline from Emirates. After ending the Emirates partnership, it retained its re-branded name and logo. SriLankan Airlines operates over 560 flights per week across Asia.

The Airline operates to 113 destinations in 51 countries (including codeshare operations) from its main hub located at Bandaranaike International Airport near Colombo. SriLankan Airlines joined the Oneworld airline alliance on 1 May 2014.

History

Air Lanka

In 1979 Former airline manager Rajeewa Jayaweera, President Jayewardena initially did not interfere after entrusting the airline to Captain Rakitha Wickramanayake and the board of directors consisting of industry officials and managers. Former Singapore President, said "How could an airline pilot run an airline?". A 1986 Presidential Commission discovered the Air Lanka Board looking and uncovered many mismanagements. Under President Wijetunga's appointment of a retired General as Chairman/MD with Air Vice Marshals and a UNP attorney as executive directors. None of them had the know-how or understanding to run a business airline.

Air Lanka was established as the flag carrier of Sri Lanka once the Sri Lankan government shut down the bankrupt Air Ceylon. Air Lanka's initial fleet consisted of two Boeing 707, leased from Singapore Airlines. One Boeing 737 was leased from Maersk Air and maintained by Air Tara. On 24 April 1980, the lease ended; Air Lanka received a replacement Boeing 737 leased from Royal Brunei. On 1 November 1980, Air Lanka commenced wide-body operations which were leased Lockheed L1011-1 Tristar from Air Canada.

On 15 April 1982, Air Lanka purchased an L1011 Tristar from All Nippon Airways. With the introduction of Tristar aircraft, the Boeing 707s were phased out. Then another L1011 was leased from Air Canada whilst a third was purchased from All Nippon. On 1 May 1982, HAECO took over the maintenance of the two Air Lanka-owned Tristars, while Air Canada maintained two leased Tristars.

On 28 March 1980, Air Lanka signed a purchase agreement for two brand new Lockheed L1011-500 Tristars, the most advanced wide-body aircraft in the world at that time.  The first Lockheed L1011-500 (4R-ULA) was accepted on 26 August 1982, at Palmdale, California. It was flown to Amsterdam as UL flight 566P. On 28 August, 4R-ULA "City of Colombo" left for its inaugural flight from Amsterdam to Colombo as UL566. It reached Colombo on 29 August. This was followed by the second Lockheed L1011-500, 4R-ULB, "City of Jayawardanapura". On 8 June 1984 the airline received its first Boeing 747-200B "King Vijaya" and the second joined later. The aircraft were used on flights to Europe and a few flights to southeast Asia. However they were retired in 1987. In 1994, Air Lanka became the Asian Launch Customer of the Airbus A340-300.

Rebranding

Air Lanka, which was state-owned, was partially privatized in 1998, with investment by Dubai-based Emirates Group, when Emirates and the Sri Lankan government signed an agreement for a ten-year strategic partnership. This agreement included exclusive rights for all aircraft ground handling and airline catering at Colombo-Bandaranaike airport for ten years. Emirates bought a 40% stake worth US$70 million (which it later increased to 43.6%) in Air Lanka and sought to refurbish the airline's image and fleet. The government retained a majority stake in the airline but gave full control to Emirates for investment and management decisions. In 1998, Air Lanka re-branded to SriLankan Airlines.

SriLankan acquired 6 Airbus A330-200s to complement its fleet of Airbus A340-300 and A320-200 aircraft. The A330-200 aircraft joined the airline between October 1999 and July 2000. The company's fourth A340-300 arrived at Colombo painted in the airline's new corporate livery. SriLankan upgraded its existing A340 fleet into a two-class configuration (business and economy class) whilst overhauling the interior to reflect the new corporate image.

The airline gradually increased its number of destinations with more additions for regional markets, notably India and the Middle East. Whilst continuing expansion in the region, SriLankan commenced flying to Jeddah, its third destination in Saudi Arabia, after Riyadh and Dammam, thus increasing the number of destinations in the Middle East to nine. Jeddah became the airline's 51st destination overall.

In 2008, Emirates notified the Sri Lankan Government that it would not renew its management contract, which then expired on 31 March 2008. It claimed that the Sri Lankan Government was seeking greater control over the day-to-day management of the airline. Emirates sold its 43.63% stake in the airline to the Government of Sri Lanka in a deal that was finalized in 2010, thus ending any affiliations the two airlines had with each other.

Modern era

In 2008 when Emirates pulled out, the accumulated profit of SriLankan was Rs. 9.288 billion in that financial year. From 2008 to 2015, when the government administration ran it, the loss for the seven years was Rs. 128.238 billion (US$875 million).

Following the ownership transfer, SriLankan took the decision to promote Colombo as a hub for flights to Asia. The first destination of the expansion plan was Shanghai; the route was initiated on 1 July 2010. The airline commenced flights to Guangzhou on 28 January 2011.

SriLankan joined the Oneworld alliance on 1 May 2014. During 2014 it started to renew and increase its fleet, with purchases of Airbus A330 and A350 models. Currently, SriLankan operates an all-Airbus fleet except for its discontinued Air-Taxi services. SriLankan retired their last Airbus A340-300 on 7 January 2016 with its last scheduled flight from Chennai to Colombo.

The airline terminated three European routes – Frankfurt, Paris and Rome – by the end of 2016. On 2020, the Frankfurt and Paris routes were resumed.

The airline absorbed the operations of sister carrier Mihin Lanka in October 2016, in a bid to create a single stronger national airline for Sri Lanka. Accordingly, SriLankan took over two of Mihin Lanka's aircraft and absorbed its route network, adding ten new destinations to SriLankan's route network.

In October 2017, SriLankan launched direct daily non-stop flights to Melbourne, Australia, its first new long-haul route in over five years and the most ambitious expansion to date. The flights restore a regular direct air link between Australia and Sri Lanka after a hiatus of sixteen years.

During the COVID-19 pandemic SriLankan performed cargo and operating relief flights. On 1 February 2020 it operated a relief flight out of Wuhan, China.

SriLankan lost 36.3 billion rupees up to August 2020 and the government approved a voluntary retirement package for 560 employees at a cost of 1.46 billion rupees.

From May 2022, due to the ongoing economic crisis in Sri Lanka which resulted in the country facing a massive fuel shortage, SriLankan's long-haul flights have to make stopovers at the airports in the Indian cities of Trivandrum, Chennai and Kochi in order to refuel.

Corporate affairs
The company's head office is at Airline Centre, Bandaranaike International Airport, Katunayake.

Livery

The initial livery consisted of red stripes on a white fuselage. The tail was solid red and sported the corporate logo, a stylized vimana locally known as "Dandu Monara" (Flying Peacock Aircraft) of King Ravana of ancient "Lanka", Ravana. as per the famous "Ramayana" mythology. The five 'tail feathers' represent the "Five Precepts" (Pancha Seela) of Buddhism and the three 'crown feathers' represent the "Triple Gem" (Buddha, Dhamma, Sangha) of Buddhism. Red colour reflects the predominant colour in the Sri Lankan national flag which represent the majority race in the country, Sinhalese. This meaningful logo was designed by Mr Shantha Saparamadu, formerly of Ceylinco advertising. This was the sole livery of the airline for nearly two decades, from January 1979 to October 1998.

After Air Lanka began a decade-long partnership with Emirates, the name was changed to Sri Lankan Airlines; the livery was changed into a much simpler one, with an all-white fuselage, covered by blue 'Sri Lankan' titles, and the tail adorned with the new corporate logo.

In May 2014, an Airbus A330 & an Airbus A320 in special oneworld livery was delivered to commemorate the airline's establishment as a oneworld member. Newly delivered aircraft are adorned with a redesigned livery accompanying a blue underbelly slogan promoting Sri Lanka as a tourist destination.

Subsidiaries
SriLankan Catering is a wholly-owned subsidiary of SriLankan Airlines, providing flight catering services to all airlines serving the Bandaranaike International Airport.

Its other businesses include provision of aircraft maintenance and overhaul services, ground handling services, packaged holiday products, aviation training as well as IT services.

Destinations

SriLankan currently operates an online network of 117 destinations and codeshares with other airlines to provide services to a total of 42 cities in 20 countries. Its interline partnerships and membership in Oneworld alliance allows it to offer passengers connectivity to over 1,000 cities in 160 countries.

SriLankan is currently the largest foreign airline operating service to India, in terms of destinations, serving 14 cities. It is also the largest foreign airline in the Maldives, serving 2 cities.

Alliance
On 11 June 2012, SriLankan Airlines was announced as oneworld's latest member-elect, on the sidelines of the IATA World Air Transport Summit in Beijing. Cathay Pacific served Sri Lankan Airlines as its sponsor through its alliance implementation program. Its membership implementation took approximately 18 months. SriLankan Airlines joined the airline alliance on 1 May 2014 as the first carrier from the Indian Sub-continent.

Codeshare agreements
SriLankan Airlines codeshares with the following airlines:

Air Canada 
Air India
American Airlines
Asiana Airlines 
Cinnamon Air
Etihad Airways
Ethiopian Airlines
Finnair
Gulf Air
Japan Airlines 
Malaysia Airlines 
Myanmar Airways International
Oman Air
Qatar Airways

Interline agreements 
SriLankan Airlines have Interline agreements with the following airlines:
 Pakistan International Airlines

Fleet

Current fleet

, SriLankan Airlines operates an all-Airbus fleet composed of the following aircraft:

Formerly operated

Fleet development
The airline received its first Airbus aircraft in 1992, the Airbus A320-200 began flying to the airline's regional routes in Maldives, Pakistan and southern India. The Airbus A340-300 was delivered in 1994. The airline was the first in Asia to use the A340. The Airbus A330-200 aircraft were delivered later on

In 2012, SriLankan Airlines aimed to boost its fleet to 35 aircraft over the next five years and had talks with both Airbus and Boeing regarding a deal. SriLankan's former CEO Kapila Chandrasena stated that the carrier wanted to add either Airbus A330-300, Boeing 787-8 or Boeing 777-300ER aircraft to its fleet to replace its Airbus A340-300s, with deliveries beginning in 2013–2014.

In April 2013, it was announced that SriLankan Airlines had won government approval to acquire four Airbus A350-900 and seven A330-300 aircraft, with deliveries of the A330-300 starting from October 2014. Deliveries for the ordered A350-900s are set to commence in 2019. A further three Airbus A350-900s were leased, with deliveries of these aircraft starting in 2017.

SriLankan phased out its last Airbus A340-300 on 7 January 2016, replaced by the A330-300 and the future A350-900. As of January 2016, construction of the airline's first Airbus A350-900 has started. On 23 February 2015, SriLankan Airlines finalized a deal with Air Lease Corporation and AerCap to acquire two Airbus A321neo aircraft, one from each leasing firm.

On 10 May 2016, due to financial difficulties, the airline announced it would cancel its order of eight A350 aircraft. As of December 2019, the four aircraft of Airbus A350-900 are still in the Airbus monthly order book and have not yet been cancelled or converted order to A330-900.

In April 2021 Sri Lankan announced that it has plans to retire 6-7 aircraft from its fleet. To replace the retiring aircraft Sri Lankan have planned A350 and A330neo aircraft.

Services

Cabin

SriLankan offers two classes of service, Business Class and Economy Class. In Business Class, SriLankan offers full flat-bed seats on all of its long haul fleet with Audio Video on Demand (AVOD) facilities. The fully flat bed seat offers a 19.5 inches wide seat that can be reclined into a 180-degree 79 inches long bed. Each seat has a 15-inch personal IFE system. SriLankan's newest fleet additions will feature Thales Avant IFE, which features modern entertainment features and extended business class seats. Its A330-300 fleet presents an all-aisle access seating in a 1-2-1 arrangement on Business Class. On its A320 and A321 fleet, Business class is configured in a 2-2 layout, offering extra reclining seats, each seat with a width of 19 inches and a pitch between 39 and 49 inches.

SriLankan provides in-seat entertainment in Economy class on all its wide-bodied aircraft and the vast majority of narrow-body aircraft. On its A330-300 and A320/A321neo aircraft, all cabin classes are provided with the option of paid-for in-flight internet access and mobile telephony services.

Entertainment

Sri Lankan Airlines offer AVOD inflight entertainment on its aircraft. The A320, A321 & A330-200 equipped with the RAVE ZODAIC Inflight Entertainment. The new A330-300 have the latest Thales AVANT Inflight Programme. SriLankan offers onboard WiFi connectivity with new Airbus A330-300 and A320/A321neo fleets in partnership with OnAir. SriLankan is South Asia's first airline to have on-board WiFi capability.

Catering

SriLankan Catering Limited is the sole airline caterer in Sri Lanka. Its hub is at Bandaranaike International Airport (BIA). SriLankan Catering's main line of business is in-flight catering to airlines that operate to Bandaranaike International Airport. Its state-of-the-art flight kitchen at BIA has a capacity of 25,000 meals per day. Incorporated in 1979, as Air Lanka Catering Services Limited with BOI status, SriLankan Catering commenced business as a joint venture with Thai Airways International. In 1998 when the joint venture agreement with Thai Airways International lapsed Air Lanka Limited bought the shares of the joint venture partner and thus Air Lanka Catering Services became the fully owned subsidiary of SriLankan Airlines Limited. Thereafter the Company changed its name to SriLankan Catering (Private) Limited in September 2000.

Frequent flyer programme
SriLankan's first frequent-flyer programme was called Serendib Miles and was abandoned in early 2000. It then became a partner of Emirates' Skywards frequent-flyer program. However, this agreement ceased to exist when the partnership between the two airlines concluded on 31 March 2008. SriLankan subsequently launched FlySmiLes, which has since added a variety of new reward partners to its program.
New membership tiers were added after the airline's enrollment to the oneworld alliance to accommodate oneworld membership tiers. Gaining members better privileges aboard all Oneworld airlines.

There are a total of four membership tiers as of 1 May 2014. They are:

FlySmiLes Blue: Base tier
FlySmiLes Classic: Oneworld Ruby
FlySmiLes Gold: Oneworld Sapphire
FlySmiLes Platinum: Oneworld Emerald

FlySmiles partners include all Oneworld airlines, Cinnamon Air and Etihad Airways and non-airlines partners like Abans and Spa Ceylon.

Accidents and incidents
Five of the six aircraft that have been destroyed, and all of the reported deaths of SriLankan Airlines passengers and employees, have been a result of the civil conflict in Sri Lanka.

1980s

On 3 May 1986, a bomb planted by the liberation group LTTE exploded on board Flight UL512 before takeoff at Bandaranaike International Airport. The bomb, which had been timed to explode in-flight, went off while the Lockheed L-1011 'Tristar' aircraft was on the ground, killing 21 of 128 passengers. Officials believe the bomb may have been concealed in crates of meat and vegetables that were being freighted to the Maldives. Other reports believe that the bomb was hidden in the aircraft's 'Fly Away Kit'.

1990s
In 1992, the right landing gear of an Air Lanka Boeing 737-200 (registration 4R-ULL) at Madras airport (now Chennai International Airport) failed upon landing and the right engine came into contact with the runway. The aircraft pulled to the right and finally came to a stop, with the nose wheel and right-wing on the grass to the right of the landing runway. The right engine caught fire – extinguished by the airport safety services – and the 104 passengers and 12 crew evacuated the aircraft via the chutes on the left side without injury. The damage to the aircraft was substantial; the plane was subsequently repaired and sold. The Indian Directorate General of Civil Aviation concluded that "the accident occurred as a result of a failure of the right-hand main landing gear beam during the landing due to pre-existing stress corrosion cracks and pits at its inboard lug hole and higher than normal landing loads contributed to its failure".

2000s

On 24 July 2001, the LTTE launched a major pre-dawn attack on Sri Lankan Airforce hangar located along the Bandaranaike International Airport. The raid left at least 19 people dead, including all 14 LTTE Cadres, two army commandos and three air force personnel. Two of SriLankan Airlines' Airbus A330 planes (4R-ALE and 4R-ALF), one A320 (4R-ABA) and one of their A340 planes (4R-ADD) were destroyed. Two other planes were damaged (A340 4R-ADC and A320 4R-ABB). A number of military planes were also damaged and destroyed.

Financial fallout 
SriLankan Airlines has not made a profit since 2008. When it last recorded a profit, while under the management of Emirates Airline. In 1998, Emirates won a proposal to handle the island nation's flag airline, Air Lanka. Following that, Emirates rebranded the aging carrier as SriLankan and modernized its fleet with contemporary Airbus A330 aircraft. Emirates obtained ten years management rights as part of the equity purchase. It later sold its ownership in the carrier for US$53 million, resulting in a nearly US$20 million loss.

Sri Lanka currently has no bankruptcy protection act, and the only option for a closedown would be a complete liquidation. If the Government is to shut down the airline, it will be compelled to write off this debt to the state banks and the Ceylon Petroleum Corporation. This could raise significant concerns about the two state banks' liquidity by foreign rating agencies and could seriously jeopardise the prospects of Sri Lankan's entire banking sector. The Government as the guarantor would also be called upon for immediate repayment of the international bond worth US$175 million.

The numerous accusations the SriLankan Airlines and Government could face in multiple jurisdictions regarding non-payment of aircraft rents could add insult to injury. This will gradually raise the risk premium for airlines leasing aircraft in Sri Lanka, making the country unappealing as a base for a carrier. However, one party might breathe a sigh of relief; Airbus, which is currently facing a more than US$ billion claim for the airline over the tainted A330 and A350 transactions for 2013.

In 2016 and 2017, SriLankan's losses were impacted by the costs in relation to the much-publicised cancellation of its Airbus A350 lease agreements. If the majority of the fleet were all due for heavy maintenance in later years, this could imply a significant charge of LKR 3 billion per annum for the prior years if restated. Such a change would make a further dent in the profits recorded during the Emirates era, as the maintenance cost was legitimately understated.

SriLankan subsidiary Mihin Lanka has never recorded an annual profit since its inception in 2007 and an accumulated loss of LKR17.27 billion in 2016. The financial performance for the current year has followed the same tread of losses. For the 6-month period loss of LKR 181 million and for the remainder of the financial year it was budgeted to lose a further LKR billion. A few months after Mihin Lanka shut down losses exceed LKR 13 billion. Most of the company's assets were acquired by SriLankan Airline on October 29, 2016.

In 2020, SriLankan Airline lost a little over US$200 million. In this period airline debt obligations today exceed over US$900 million (LKR 372 billion). The bulk of these appears to be debts to state banks and the CPC, both wholly owned by the Government of Sri Lanka. The Airline also has at least one, sovereign guaranteed, internationally-issued bond worth US$175 million.

According to the Finance Ministry data, SriLankan lost LKR 24.5 billion from April to July 2021, as the company, which is already losing money, encountered even more difficulties during the SARS-CoV 2 outbreak. In the fiscal year ending March 2021, SriLankan lost LKR 58 billion.

Controversies 
In March 2015, a report was released following a Board of Inquiry investigation into corruption at SriLankan during the time it was under the chairmanship of Nishantha Wickramasinghe. The Board has reported that corruption was widespread and confirmed the allegations of Nishantha Wickramasinghe's affairs. However, the Mahinda Rajapaksa Information Centre denied the allegations and accused the report of being biased and invalid, accusing the head of the committee of publicly supporting the current government in the elections and lacking technical knowledge about the aviation industry. It further claimed that he had been bribed to submit such a report as a publicity stunt to humiliate the previous government and that most of the points within it were untrue. The airline's short-lived Air-Taxi service and its mismanagement was found to have caused the loss of millions of dollars to the airline.
 
In October 2015, the Presidential Commission of Inquiry to Investigate and Inquire into Serious Acts of Fraud, Corruption and Abuse of Power, State Resources and Privileges (PRECIFAC) attempted to summon Wickramasinghe to inquire about various irregularities in the Airline; however, they were unable to locate him, and his wife claimed he had not come home for three years and that she was unaware of his whereabouts. Later he notified the PRECIFAC that he was abroad and was unable to give a statement.

On 14 April 2021, the SriLankan Airlines in its official Twitter handle claimed that Sri Lankan cargo had made history by operating three successive cargo charter flights to Entebbe International Airport which is Uganda's only international airport uplifting over 102 metric tonnes of printed papers in February 2021. The information on whether what kind of printed papers were not revealed by Sri Lankan Airlines due to confidential reasons. However, the cargo carrier deleted the tweet for unknown reasons and it created doubts about the transparency of Sri Lankan Airlines and speculations arose about the transfer of "printed papers" cargo charter flights that departed to Uganda in February 2021. Sri Lankan Airlines later issued a statement clarifying that the printed material which was deported to Uganda included only the Ugandan currency notes and it further revealed that due to security reasons with bordering Kenya, Ugandan government preferred to obtain printed Ugandan shilling currency notes from a global security printer. The Biyagama branch of the De La Rue company is responsible for printing currency notes to countries including Uganda. SriLankan insisted that the consignment was purely commercial in nature and brought much needed foreign revenue to the airlines as well as for the country.

SriLankan Airlines decided to sue Airbus for $ 1 billion as damages, loss of reputation, reimbursement of costs, and interests. The action follows the information revealed in the judgment of the Crown Court of the United Kingdom approving the Deferred Prosecution Agreement between the Serious Fraud Office and Airbus SE. The national carrier has also demanded from Airbus for cancellation of the A350-900 Purchase Agreement for four A350-900 aircraft, returning the advance payment of $ 19 million made for those four A350-900 aircraft.

See also
 Colombo Marathon, SriLankan Airlines is one of the sponsors of this primary marathon of Sri Lanka
 Mihin Lanka, a former government owned low-fare leisure airline.
 Bandaranaike International Airport, the hub of SriLankan Airlines.

References

 Birch, Doug. "SriLankan Airlines". Air International, February 2003, Vol 64 No 2. pp. 26–30.

External links

  

 
Airlines of Sri Lanka
Airlines established in 1979
Government-owned airlines
Sri Lankan companies established in 1979